Zab'a, was a Palestinian Arab village in the District of Baysan. It was depopulated by the Israel Defense Forces during the 1947–1948 Civil War in Mandatory Palestine on May 12, 1948, as part of Operation Gideon. It was located
5.5 km northeast of Baysan on Wadi Yubla or Wadi al-'Ashsha.

History
2 km east of the village was Tell Ismail, which was used by the villagers as cemetery.

At the time of the 1931 census, Zab'a had 37 occupied houses and a population of 147, 146 Muslims and 1 Jew.

The population of the village in the  1945 statistics  was 170 Muslims. The village lands comprised 3,968 dunums; 3,424 owned by Jews, 156 owned by Arabs, and 388 public.  Of this, Arabs used all the 156 dunams for cereals, while a total of 448 dunams were non-cultivable land.

Beyt Yosef was established in 1937 2 km northeast of the village site, on land they had purchased. After Zab'a became depopulated, a farm named Doshen was established on village land inn 1955.

In 1992, the site was described as "covered with grass, lotus trees, and stones. Israelis have established several agricultural projects and fisheries on the village land. Other parts of the surrounding land is used for grazing."

References

Bibliography

External links
Welcome To Zab'a
Zab'a,  Zochrot

Arab villages depopulated during the 1948 Arab–Israeli War